Chutti TV is a 24-hour Tamil kids pay television channel from the Sun TV Network in India. The target audience are children aged between 3 and 17. It was launched on 29 April 2007, making it Sun TV Network's first ever television channel for kids.

Chutti TV made a partnership with American TV network Nickelodeon until the Tamil audio was added to the Indian channel.

See also
 Sun Group
 Sun TV Network

References

External links
 Official Website 
 Sun TV Network Website
 Sun Group Website

Children's television channels in India
Tamil-language television channels
Television channels and stations established in 2007
Sun Group
Television stations in Chennai
2007 establishments in Tamil Nadu